California's 18th district may refer to:

 California's 18th congressional district
 California's 18th State Assembly district
 California's 18th State Senate district